Calley is the surname of:

People
Brian Calley (born 1977), American politician, Lieutenant Governor of Michigan 
Henry Calley (1914–1997), English Second World War bomber pilot and politician
John Calley (1930–2011), American film studio executive and producer
John Calley (engineer) (1663–1717), metalworker, plumber and glass-blower who helped develop Thomas Newcomen's steam engine
Roy Calley, English journalist
Samuel Calley (1821–1883), American politician
Thomas Charles Pleydell Calley (1856–1932), British Army major-general and politician
William Calley (born 1943), former U.S. Army officer and war criminal involved in the My Lai Massacre

Fictional characters
Byron Calley, better known as Burner (comics), a Marvel Comics mutant
Calley, a character from the U.K. television series Chuggington.
Clifford Calley, on the U.S. television series The West Wing'', played by Mark Feuerstein

See also
Callie, a given name and surname
Cally, a given name and surname